YCL may refer to:

 All-Union Leninist Young Communist League, the youth wing of the Communist Party of the Soviet Union
 YCL, the IATA code for Charlo Airport in Charlo, New Brunswick, Canada
York County Libraries, a public library system in York County, Pennsylvania, United States
 Young Calvinist League, a youth ministry in Canada and the United States
 Young Communist League, list of various organisations, some with variant names
 Young Communist League, the youth wing of the historical Communist Party of Australia (1920–1991)
 Young Communist League (Great Britain) the youth wing of the Communist Party of Britain
 Young Communist League of Canada the youth wing of the Communist Party of Canada
 Young Communist League, Nepal is the youth wing of the Communist Party of Nepal (Maoist)
Young Communist League, USA the youth wing of the Communist Party USA